Fuck That may refer to:

 "Fuck That", a song by Skrillex from the album Recess
 "Fuck That", a song by Death Grips from the album The Money Store
"Fuk Dat", a 1993 song by Sagat, later retitled "Why Is It? (Funk Dat)"